SVT2 (SVT Två; commonly referred to as Tvåan), is one of the two main television channels broadcast by Sveriges Television in Sweden.

Launched in 1969 by Sveriges Radio, the channel was until the 1990s the most watched in Sweden for many years, but now serves as SVT's specialist television network, carrying more highbrow and minority programming compared to the more mainstream SVT1.

History

Debate persisted throughout the 1960s over a second Swedish television channel, following the opening of Radiotjänst TV (later Sveriges Radio TV) in 1956. Some wanted the new channel to be private and funded by advertising, but it was decided that the public service broadcaster, Sveriges Radio, would take responsibility. Sweden was the second Nordic country to launch a second TV channel, after Finland who did it in March 1965.

TV2 began broadcasting on Friday 5 December 1969 - an occasion known widely as the "channel split" (kanalklyvningen). While TV1 was broadcast on VHF frequencies, TV2 used UHF frequencies, which meant that households had to buy a special converter box if they wanted to see TV2.

Although TV2 was part of the same company as TV1, they were both editorially independent and encouraged to compete with each other. Both channels later agreed not to compete directly with similar programmes. For example, the weekend variety shows were aired on TV2 on Friday nights and TV1 on Saturday nights.

Both channels also shared a national news service, TV-nytt, which broadcast short bulletins at 7pm and 9pm on TV2 (6pm, 7.30pm and 10pm on TV1) - accompanying this on TV2 was Rapport, a 20-minute news magazine emphasising in-depth reports, analysis and commentary. The initial format gave rise to accusations of left-wing bias with TV2 described by some as the red channel. A revamp in 1972 saw Rapport move to 7.30pm and introduce a broader format, eventually establishing the programme as the most watched Swedish television news.

The use of UHF frequencies also allowed TV2 to broadcast regional programming for the first time. In November 1970, the first regional news bulletin, Sydnytt (covering Scania and Blekinge, was launched. In July 1979, both TV1 and TV2 were placed under the management of Sveriges Television (SVT).

Having gradually introduced regional news services across the country, TV2 was relaunched as the Sweden Channel (Sverigekanalen) on 31 August 1987. As part of a reorganisation, the network's homegrown output consisted largely of programming from SVT's regional production centres (there were ten of them in total, the biggest of them being Gothenburg and Malmö), although some Stockholm-produced output continued, including Rapport.

The revamp helped to establish TV2 as the most watched television network in Sweden, although by 1994, the channel lost its lead to commercial network TV4. The increasing competition led to a relaunch as SVT2 in 1996, with programming from both Stockholm and the regional centres now shared between both channels. Among the changes, the 6pm edition of SVT1's news service Aktuellt moved to the channel, while Rapport launched breakfast and lunchtime editions, but also moved some of its shorter bulletins to SVT1.

Logos and identities

2001 to 2008 
A major corporate revamp in 2001 saw SVT2 repositioned as a more specialist channel with SVT1 taking a broader, mainstream profile. As part of the revamp, Rapport moved to the first network and the less popular Aktuellt moved to SVT2, initially airing twice nightly at 6pm and 9pm. Regional news bulletins continued on SVT2 as before.

Other popular programming on the network (such as Expedition: Robinson) also moved to SVT1, although an effort was made to boost audiences with new programming schedules in 2003. In-vision continuity was abandoned in January 2005 in favour of pre-recorded announcements.

2008 to 2016 

A further revamp in August 2008 saw all regional news services moved to SVT1. Aktuellt relaunched as an in-depth current affairs programme, until March 2012, when the programme was extended to an hour on Mondays-Thursdays, incorporating extended news coverage, sport and a late regional news bulletin.

2016-present

Programming
Programming on SVT2 is generally more specialist than on the primary SVT1. The station's output includes most of SVT's cultural programming, minority output in the Sami and Finnish languages, sign language programming, independent films, current affairs and parliamentary coverage.

SVT2 does not broadcast 24 hours a day. As of January 2019, SVT2 signs off at shortly after 5 am and resumes broadcasting between 8am and 9am.  During the daytime on most weekdays, SVT Forum, the network's umbrella programme for live current events, airs.  A mid-afternoon Rapport bulletin airs at 4pm.

At 5:15pm, SVT2 begins its evening schedule with three minority-language news bulletins: Ođđasat (Sami), Nyhetstecken (Swedish Sign Language) and Uutiset (Finnish), followed by a documentary programme. The channel's main news programme, Aktuellt at 9pm includes in-depth analysis, interviews, sports updates, cultural and regional news and weather.  Repeats of sport current affairs output air throughout the night.

Acquired programming
Acquired programming on SVT2 has included If Tomorrow Comes, Six Feet Under, The Sopranos, K Street, Parkinson, The Kumars at No. 42, The Wire, Nip/Tuck and Veronica Mars. It has also included a few daily telenovelas from some European and Latin American countries.

As is the practice with the rest of Swedish television and film industry, acquired foreign programmes on SVT2 are shown in their respective original language audio with Swedish subtitles.

See also
SVT1
List of Swedish television channels''

References

External links
SVT 

Television channels in Sweden
Television channels and stations established in 1969
2
1969 establishments in Sweden